Élise Tielrooy (born May, 7 1967) is a French actress of film, stage and television.

Theater

Filmography

References

External links 
 

1964 births
Living people
French film actresses
French stage actresses
French television actresses